Cechenena chimaera is a moth of the  family Sphingidae. It is known from south-east Asia, including Malaysia, Thailand, Indonesia and the Philippines.

The wingspan is about 84 mm. Adults are sexually dimorphic. It is very similar to Cechenena aegrota, but larger and there is a difference in the pattern on the forewing upperside. There is a series of conspicuous paired black spots on the underside of the abdomen. The hindwing upperside is dark brown, although the median band is dirty yellow and the costa is pure yellow for half of its length.

References

Cechenena
Moths described in 1894